Saint-Servais is a commune in the Finistère department of Brittany in north-western France.

See also
Communes of the Finistère department
Yan' Dargent
Saint Servais Parish close

References

External links

Mayors of Finistère Association 

Communes of Finistère